Yuriy Ivanovich Mikhaylus (born 17 June 1964) is a former Soviet and Ukrainian footballer, the champion of Ukraine with SC Tavriya Simferopol.

External links 
 
 

1964 births
Living people
Russian emigrants to Ukraine
Ukrainian footballers
Ukrainian Premier League players
SC Tavriya Simferopol players
Association football midfielders